Charlotte May Warren is an American politician from Maine. Warren, a Democrat from Hallowell, Maine, was elected to the Maine House of Representatives in November 2014.

Warren was born and raised on a farm in Pittston, Maine. She was a first generation college student when she graduated from the University of Maine at Farmington in 1994 with a B.A. in psychology. She earned a M.S. in adult education from the University of Southern Maine and a M.S.W. in Organizational/Community Practice from the University of New England.

Prior to her election to the Maine Legislature, Warren served on the Hallowell City Council, including 5 years as mayor.

In 2021, Warren apologized for saying that straight white men "are too emotional to be in politics" on social media.

References

Year of birth missing (living people)
Living people
People from Pittston, Maine
People from Hallowell, Maine
Maine Democrats
University of Maine at Farmington alumni
University of Southern Maine alumni
University of New England (United States) alumni
Mayors of places in Maine
Women mayors of places in Maine
Women state legislators in Maine
21st-century American politicians
21st-century American women politicians
LGBT state legislators in Maine
21st-century American LGBT people